Brian Adams may refer to:

 Brian Adams (admiral), Australian admiral, Deputy Chief of Navy (2000–2002)
 Brian Adams (basketball), American basketball coach
 Brian Adams (footballer) (born 1947), English former footballer
 Brian Adams (politician) (born 1969), member of the South Carolina Senate
 Brian Adams (racewalker) (born 1949), represented Great Britain at the 1976 Summer Olympics
 Brian Adams (wrestler) (1964–2007), professional wrestler and actor
 Brian Adams, chairman of Northern Irish team Ards F.C.

See also
 Bryan Adams (disambiguation)
 Bryan Adams (born 1959), Canadian musical artist
 Brian Adam (1948–2013), Scottish politician